Sadal (also Romanized as Sa‘dal) is a village in Chaldoran-e Shomali Rural District of the Central District of Chaldoran County, West Azerbaijan province, Iran. At the 2006 National Census, its population was 949 in 208 households. The following census in 2011 counted 1,140 people in 313 households. The latest census in 2016 showed a population of 1,092 people in 322 households; it was the largest village in its rural district.

References 

Chaldoran County

Populated places in West Azerbaijan Province

Populated places in Chaldoran County